The neodamodes (neodamōdeis) were helots freed after passing a time of service as hoplites in the Spartan army.

The date of their first apparition is uncertain. Thucydides does not explain the origin of this special category. Jean Ducat, in his book Les Hoplites (1990), concludes that their statute "was largely inspired by the measures dictated concerning the Brasidians",  i.e. the helots freed after taking part to the expedition of Brasidas in 424 BC.

Their existence is attested from 420 to 369 BC. They were part of Sparta's army and 2,000 of them are recorded taking part, for example, to Agesilaus II's campaign in Ionia between 396 and 394 BC.

The name comes from the words νέος neos, meaning "new", and  dêmos, meaning "deme or territory". Differently from what is written by Hesychius of Alexandria, who brings together the neodamodes and the Athenian demotes (citizens of a deme), they never acquired full citizenship. The suffix -ωδης -ôdês signals only a resemblance.  In truth, the only deme they joined was that of the Perioeci.

See also
Perioeci
Sciritae
Trophimoi

References

Paul Cartledge, Sparta and Lakonia. A Regional History 1300 to 362 BC, Routledge, New York City, 2002 (2nd edition) 
Richard Talbert, "The Role of the Helots in the Class Struggle at Sparta", Historia, Bd. 38, H. 1 (1st Qtr., 1989), pp. 22-40
 Jean Ducat, Les Hilotes, École française d'Athènes, Hellenic correspondence bulletin, suppl. XX, Athens, 1990 see link from CEFAEL ; 
 Edmond Lévy, Sparte : histoire politique et sociale jusqu’à la conquête romaine, Seuil, coll.  Points Histoire, Paris, 2003.
 T. Alfieri Tonini, Il problema dei neodamodeis nell’ambito della società spartana, Rendiconti dell’Instituto Lombardo, #109 (1975), pp. 305–316 ;

Social classes of Sparta
Slavery in ancient Greece
Slave soldiers